Prometheus is an operatic 'Szenisches Oratorium' (scenic oratorio) in five scenes by Rudolf Wagner-Régeny, with a German libretto by the composer after Aeschylus. The opera also uses Goethe's poem "Prometheus".

Performance history
It was first performed on 12 September 1959 at the Staatstheater Kassel and revived in concert three times in East Berlin between 1960 and 1984.

Roles

Synopsis
Prometheus, chained to his rock by Zeus, prophesies that the saviour of mankind will appear after ten generations.

References

External links
Work details, Boosey & Hawkes

Operas by Rudolf Wagner-Régeny
German-language operas
Operas
1959 operas
Operas based on works by Aeschylus
Operas based on works by Johann Wolfgang von Goethe
Works based on Prometheus Bound